The American Samoa women's national volleyball team represents American Samoa in international women's volleyball competitions and friendly matches.

It won the gold medal at the 2015 Pacific Games.

References

External links
American Samoa Volleyball Federation

National women's volleyball teams
Volleyball
Volleyball in American Samoa
Women's sports in American Samoa